Speocirolana xilitla is a species of crustacean in the family Cirolanidae. It is known from a cave near Xilitla, San Luis Potosi. The specific name refers to this town. It is the southernmost species in the genus Speocirolana.

Habitat
The type series was collected from a clear-water pond in Cueva de las Catarinas, in complete darkness some 120 meters from its entrance.

Description
Speocirolana xilitla is among the largest members of its genus: the largest female (the holotype) measures  in total length. The body is 2.5 times as long as wide. The pleotelson is rounded. No males are known.

References

Cymothoida
Freshwater crustaceans of North America
Endemic crustaceans of Mexico
Cave crustaceans